Yukarıboğaz can refer to:

 Yukarıboğaz, Tavas
 Yukarıboğaz, Yenipazar